Archduke Karl Salvator of Austria (Italian: Carlo Salvatore Maria Giuseppe Giovanni Battista Filippo Jacopo Gennaro Lodovico Gonzaga Raniero; German: Karl Salvator Maria Joseph Johann Baptist Philipp Jakob Januarius Ludwig Gonzaga Ranier; Florence, 30 April 1839 – Vienna, 18 January 1892), was a member of the Tuscan branch of the House of Habsburg.

Early life and career
He was an Austrian Archduke, a son of Leopold II, Grand Duke of Tuscany and second wife Marie Antoinette of Tuscany. He was a Feldmarschall-Leutnant of the Imperial (k.u.k.) Austro-Hungarian Army. He worked with Count George von Dormus as inventor of early self-loading small arms including the Salvator Dormus pistol and the Salvator-Dormus M1893 heavy machine gun.

Family and children
He married in Rome on 19 September 1861 his first cousin Princess Maria Immaculata of Bourbon-Two Sicilies (Naples, 14 April 1844 – Vienna, 18 February 1899), daughter of his maternal uncle Ferdinand II of the Two Sicilies, and second wife Maria Theresa of Austria.

Their children were:
Archduchess Maria Theresia (Alt-Bunzlau, 18 September 1862 – 10 May 1933), married in Vienna on 28 February 1886 Archduke Charles Stephen of Austria (1860 – 1933) and had issue.
Archduke Leopold Salvator (Alt-Bunzlau, Bohemia, 15 October 1863 – Vienna, 4 September 1931), married in Frohsdorf on 24 October 1889 Blanca, Infanta of Spain (1868 – 1949), and had issue
Archduke Franz Salvator (Altmünster, 21 August 1866 – Vienna, 20 April 1939), married firstly in Ischl on 31 July 1890 Archduchess Marie Valerie of Austria (1868 – 1924), and had issue, and married secondly morganatically in Vienna on 28 April 1934 Melanie Freiin von Riesenfels (1898 – 1984), without issue
Archduchess Karoline Marie (Altmünster, 5 September 1869 – Budapest, 12 May 1945), married in Vienna on 30 May 1894 Prince August Leopold of Saxe-Coburg and Gotha (1867 – 1922) and had issue.
Archduke Albrecht Salvator (Alt-Bunzlau, 22 November 1871 – Bolzano, 27 February 1896), unmarried and without issue
Archduchess Maria Antoinette (Vienna, 18 April 1874 – Arco, 14 January 1891)
Archduchess Maria Immakulata (Baden bei Wien, 3 September 1878 – Schloss Altshausen, 25 November 1968), married in Vienna on 29 October 1900 Duke Robert of Württemberg (1873 – 1947) without issue
Archduke Rainer Salvator (Vienna, 27 February 1880 – Arco, 4 May 1889)
Archduchess Henriette Maria (Vienna, 20 February 1884 – Traunkirchen, 13 August 1886)
Archduke Ferdinand Salvator (Baden bei Wien, 2 June 1888 – Traunkirchen, 28 July 1891)

Ancestry

References

1839 births
1892 deaths
House of Habsburg-Lorraine
Austrian princes
Engineers from Florence
Knights of the Golden Fleece of Austria
Knights Grand Cross of the Order of Pope Pius IX
Nobility from Florence
Military personnel from Florence
Burials at the Imperial Crypt
Sons of monarchs
Non-inheriting heirs presumptive